Amaya Midnight Coleman-Evans (born 25 December 2003) is a professional footballer who plays as a forward for Blackburn Rovers.

Coleman-Evans is eligible to feature for both England and Spain at international level.

Club career 
Amaya Coleman-Evans started her career in Spain playing for Real Oviedo where she earned several first team appearances after coming through the Spanish clubs youth system.

After just two season in Spain, Coleman-Evans signed for Blackburn Rovers in January 2022 after a successful trial with the FA Women's Championship club. In July 2022, it was announced that Coleman-Evans had departed Blackburn Rovers.

In August 2022, Coleman-Evans joined National League club Burnley.

Style of play 
Amaya Coleman-Evans likes to play wide when in attacking positions, taking defenders on in one-on-one situations. She has been known to cross the ball into the box for the striker to attack.

References 

2003 births
Living people
English women's footballers
Blackburn Rovers L.F.C. players
Spanish women's footballers
Women's association footballers not categorized by position